Kalna may refer to several places:

 Kalna, India, a city in West Bengal, India
 Kalna (Vidhan sabha constituency)
 Kalna, Poland, a village in Poland
 Kalna (Crna Trava), a village in Serbia in the Crna Trava municipality
 Kalna (Knjaževac), a village in Serbia in the Knjaževac municipality
 Kálna, the Hungarian name for Calna village, Vad, Cluj, Romania
 Kalna Parish, Latvia

Others 
 Kalna College
 Kalna General College
 Kalna Manor
 Kalna Polytechnic

See also